KCMX-FM (101.9 MHz) is a radio station broadcasting an adult contemporary music format. Licensed to Ashland, Oregon, United States, the station serves the Medford-Ashland area.  The station is currently owned by Stephens Media Group, through licensee SMG-Medford, LLC.

Translators
KCMX-FM broadcasts on the following translator:

Previous logo
 (KCMX-FM's logo under previous "Lite 102" branding)

References

External links
Official Website

Mainstream adult contemporary radio stations in the United States
Ashland, Oregon
CMX-FM
Radio stations established in 1978
1978 establishments in Oregon